Byobu or Byōbu may refer to:
Byōbu: Japanese folding screens
Byobu Rock: a large rock on the coast of Queen Maud Land
Byobu (software): an enhancement for GNU Screen or tmux